The Census (Return Particulars and Removal of Penalties) Act 2019 (c. 28) is an act of the Parliament of the United Kingdom. The act removed penalties for people not responding to new census questions on sexual orientation, gender identity (including transgender status).

Provisions
The provisions of the act include:
Amending the Census Act 1920 to add questions on sexual orientation and gender identity to the census.

Amending the Census Act (Northern Ireland) 1969 to add questions on sexual orientation and gender identity to the census.

Making it voluntary to answer any such questions.

See also

2021 United Kingdom census
Census (Amendment) (Scotland) Act 2019

References

United Kingdom Acts of Parliament 2019
2019 in British law
2019 in British politics
Transgender law in the United Kingdom
2021 United Kingdom census
2019 in LGBT history